Victor Bruce Sullivan (7 December 1918 – 29 January 1993) was a member of the Queensland Legislative Assembly.

Biography
Sullivan was born in Launceston, Tasmania, the son of James Bruce Sullivan and his wife Julia Ellen (née Brown). He was educated at Downlands College in Toowoomba and on leaving school became a grain, beef, pork, and lamb farmer. He served in the Second Australian Imperial Force as an attachment to the U.S. forces and was engaged in the movement of troops and supplies in New Guinea.

On 8 April 1948 Sullivan married Gwenneth Joan Becker and together had a two sons and a daughter. His daughter died in 1970 in an automobile accident. He died from a heart attack while surfing at Caloundra in January 1993.

Public career
At the 1960 Queensland state election, Sullivan won the seat of Condamine for the Country Party, defeating the sitting member, Les Diplock of the Queensland Labor Party. He had a long career in the Queensland Parliament and retired at the 1983 Queensland state election.

In July 1982 he and fellow National Party member and ministerial colleague, Ken Tomkins, were involved in a scandal that came to be known as the Melbidir affair. They were on a tour in the government vessel the Melbidir to examine the conditions of Aboriginal communities in the Torres Strait islands when they were photographed from a plane flying overhead leisurely fishing from the vessel. Both men were reluctantly forced to resign from cabinet with Sullivan sitting on the back bench for the rest of his political career.
  
Sullivan didn't mind a drink and during the motion of condolence for him in the parliament in 1993, Tom Burns, the then Deputy Premier of Queensland, reminisced about the time Sullivan fell asleep while giving a speech in the parliament.

At one stage he was mooted to take over as Premier of Queensland from Joh Bjelke-Petersen and served as the Acting Premier when both the Premier and Deputy Premier were overseas in 1982. He held several portfolios in the ministry including:
 Minister for Lands and Forests 1968–1972
 Minister for Primary Industries 1972–1974
 Minister for Primary Industries and Fisheries 1974–1975
 Minister for Primary Industries 1975–1980
 Minister for Mines and Energy 1980
 Minister for Commerce and Industry 1980–1982

References

Members of the Queensland Legislative Assembly
1918 births
1993 deaths
National Party of Australia members of the Parliament of Queensland
20th-century Australian politicians
Australian Army personnel of World War II